Gyula Andrássy High School (Andrássy Gyula Gimnázium és Kollégium), formerly Rózsa Ferenc Gimnázium (RFG) or Rózsa for short, is a high school (grammar school) in Békéscsaba, Hungary. The school is the oldest in the city and one of the most renowned in Békés county.

History
The school was founded by the Lutheran church in 1855, as Algimnázium. In 1895 the school was upgraded to Főgimnázium and got the name Rudolf Főgimnázium. After the Communist takeover (1948) the school has been taken into state property and took the name of Ferenc Rózsa. Rózsa was a member of the then-illegal Communist Party of Hungary between the two World Wars, criticised the political system and died in prison under unclear circumstances. During the Communist era he was regarded as a martyr.

Present days
The school moved into its current building in 1994. Rózsa Gimnázium holds steadily its position among the best schools in the county, in 2004 its pupils received 11 awards on different high school contests. Based on school contest results Rózsa Gimnázium was always among the best 20 schools of Hungary between 1986 and 2006. The local government renamed the school in 2008 as Andrássy Gyula Gimnázium és Kollégium. Andrássy was a prime minister of Kingdom of Hungary between 1867–1871, and the foreign minister of Austria-Hungary between 1871-1879.

Notable students
 Endre Bajcsy-Zsilinszky, politician and political columnist
 Zoltán Berczik, European Champions table tennis player
 Géza Gyóni, poet
 Judit Pogány, actress

References

External links 

 

Gymnasiums in Hungary
Békés County
Andrássy family
Educational institutions established in 1855
1850s establishments in Hungary